Gran Rio (English: big river) is a river of Suriname. The Gran Rio joins with the Pikin Rio (English: small river) to form Suriname River. The river runs from the northern hills of the Eilerts de Haan Mountains. It has a stony bottom, forms many tiny islands and has many rapids. At Awarradam, there are many rapids and waterfalls. The river was first explored in 1908 by Eilerts de Haan to find the source of the Suriname River.

See also
List of rivers of Suriname

Notes

References
Rand McNally, The New International Atlas, 1993.

External links

Rivers of Suriname